Lakhala is a union council of Abbottabad District in Khyber-Pakhtunkhwa province of Pakistan. According to the 2017 Census of Pakistan, the population is 5,237.

Subdivisions
Gandah
Kangrora
Khanda Khoh
Lakhala
Pind

References

Union councils of Abbottabad District